In United States politics, the gas tax holiday or the gas tax loophole was originally a 2008 proposal made by presidential contenders Arizona Senator John McCain and New York Senator Hillary Clinton to suspend the federal excise tax on gasoline from Memorial Day to Labor Day in the year 2008. Proponents argued that this could potentially reduce the price of gas at the pump by about 18.4 cents a gallon for regular unleaded gasoline and 24.4 cents a gallon for diesel. If it were done, it was estimated the gas tax holiday would save consumers roughly $30 over the three-month period it would be instated.  However, Barack Obama and others argued that the oil companies would not significantly lower prices and would instead pocket most of the tax cut, effectively turning the cut into a tax loophole.

In 2022, in the midst of a wave of inflation, President Joe Biden made a similar proposal.

Proponents 
Presidential hopefuls John McCain and Hillary Clinton both championed this proposal. The two political opponents purported this to be a short-term fix for gas prices that were set to hit $4 a gallon in the summer of 2008. With economic woes topping the American peoples' list of concerns, this became a hotly debated issue in the 2008 U.S. Presidential Election.

Critics 
The proposal met criticism from a wide array of news sources, politicians, the vast majority of economists, and the Bush administration.

Economic theory is very clear that the incidence of a consumption tax (who is expected to pay the tax) is inconsequential. Even if it were to lower the cost paid by the consumer, it would just result in a spike in demand during the period it was in effect with rising prices in response.

Barack Obama was perhaps the most visibly vocal critic of the measure. He and other critics of the proposal have exclaimed that the holiday would be nothing more than a "short-term, quick-fix" that would not solve the nation's current and long term problems of high oil prices and foreign oil dependency. Critics have nearly unanimously denounced the scheme as nothing more than pandering for votes in the Indiana and North Carolina primaries.

Since fuel tax is collected from producers and given the fixed supply and high demand for gasoline, it has been considered unlikely that producers would pass that savings on to consumers at the pump. Furthermore, State highway officials claimed the move could eliminate nearly 300,000 jobs over the summer months due to nearly $9 billion in lost revenue that would be incurred if some other source of revenue is not found. Hillary Clinton proposed levying a new tax on oil company profits in order to make up for it. However, both the Clinton and McCain proposals would most likely never be passed due to the overwhelming opposition of congressional leaders.

2022 proposals

In January, 2022, Florida governor Ron DeSantis proposed a $1 billion gas tax holiday to counter inflation. The proposed policy would have taken place between July 1, 2022 through November 30, 2022. The final legislation resulted instead in a one month gas tax holiday for October, 2022. Other states, including New York, Georgia, Connecticut and Maryland, have suspended state gasoline taxes in 2022.

In June, 2022, President Joe Biden revived the idea of a federal gas tax holiday in the midst of a surge in inflation, including rising gasoline prices. However, there was enough opposition in Congress that the proposal appeared unlikely to gain enough votes to pass.

See also
 Fuel taxes in the United States

References

Taxation in the United States
2008 in American politics